The 21st Virginia Cavalry Regiment was a cavalry regiment raised in Virginia for service in the Confederate States Army during the American Civil War. It fought in Southwest Virginia, East Tennessee, and the Shenandoah Valley.

Virginia's 21st Cavalry Regiment was organized in August, 1862, with companies which had served in the Virginia State Line. The unit was assigned to W.E. Jones' and McCausland's Brigade, and in April, 1864, it contained 317 effectives. It took an active part in various conflicts in East Tennessee, western Virginia, and in the Shenandoah Valley. During mid-April, 1865, the regiment disbanded. Its field officers were Colonel W.E. Peters, Lieutenant Colonel David Edmundson, and Major Stephen P. Halsey.

See also

List of Virginia Civil War units
List of West Virginia Civil War Confederate units

References

Units and formations of the Confederate States Army from Virginia
1862 establishments in Virginia
Military units and formations established in 1862
1865 disestablishments in Virginia
Military units and formations disestablished in 1865